Bouteroue may refer to:

Persons
 Claude de Boutroue d'Aubigny (1620–1680), a knight and an Intendant of Nouvelle-France from 1668 to 1670

Places
 Bouteroue Lake, Quebec, Canada
 Bouteroue Creek, Quebec, Canada